The British Grand Prix, formerly known as the Birmingham Grand Prix or the Aviva Birmingham Grand Prix, is an annual athletics meeting. Since 2010 it has been a part of the Diamond League series of track and field meets.

In 2020 the event was due to be held at the Gateshead International Stadium but was cancelled due to the COVID-19 pandemic in the United Kingdom. The event returned to Gateshead in 2021. The 2022 event was held at Alexander Stadium in Birmingham.

Venues

World records
Over the course of its history, the following world records have been set at the British Grand Prix.

Meeting records

Men

Women

References

External links
Diamond League – Gateshead Official Web Site

Athletics competitions in England
Diamond League
Sport in Birmingham, West Midlands
Track and field in the United Kingdom
Sport in Gateshead
Sport in Sheffield
Athletics in London
IAAF Super Grand Prix
IAAF Grand Prix
IAAF World Outdoor Meetings